Claus Reitmaier (born 17 March 1964 in Würzburg) is a German football coach and former player.

Honours
 DFB-Pokal finalist: 1995–96
 Bundesliga runner-up: 1993–94
 Norwegian Football Cup finalist: 2005

References

External links
  

1964 births
Living people
German footballers
German expatriate footballers
Bundesliga players
2. Bundesliga players
Stuttgarter Kickers players
1. FC Kaiserslautern players
Karlsruher SC players
VfL Wolfsburg players
Borussia Mönchengladbach players
FC Rot-Weiß Erfurt players
Viktoria Aschaffenburg players
Eliteserien players
Lillestrøm SK players
Expatriate footballers in Norway
Association football goalkeepers
Sportspeople from Würzburg
Footballers from Bavaria
West German footballers
West German expatriate footballers
West German expatriate sportspeople in Austria
Expatriate footballers in Austria
German expatriate sportspeople in Norway
Association football goalkeeping coaches
Hamburger SV non-playing staff